John Edward Grenier (August 24, 1930 – November 6, 2007) was a figure in the 1964 presidential campaign of Barry Goldwater. Grenier is one of the figures credited with using the Southern Strategy in that campaign and one of the figures responsible for the rise of the Republican Party in Alabama.

Grenier ran for the United States Senate in 1966 against John Sparkman. Grenier only won 39 percent of the vote but it was the highest percentage of the vote that anybody had won against Sparkman in Sparkman's Senate career.

Grenier was also involved in campaign of Alabama Republican Guy Hunt and the controversies which followed Hunt during his term in office.

Grenier also worked as a litigator for Lange Simpson Robinson and Somerville, one of the oldest and most distinguished law firms in Birmingham Alabama, for many years.

Grenier died of lung cancer on November 6, 2007, in a hospital in Houston, Texas.

References

1930 births
2007 deaths
Alabama politicians
People from New Orleans
Alabama Republicans
People from Birmingham, Alabama
Deaths from lung cancer
Deaths from cancer in Texas